Milk coffee is a category of coffee-based drinks made with milk.
Johan Nieuhof, the Dutch ambassador to China, is credited as the first person to drink coffee with milk when he experimented with it around 1660.

Varieties

Antoccino 

An antoccino is a single shot of espresso with steamed milk in a 1:1 ratio, served in an espresso cup. Despite the name, it has no link to Italy, nor any meaning in Italian.

Breve 
Espresso made with a steamed mixture of half milk and half cream (i.e., half and half); size can vary – the name relates to the use of cream and milk.

Café au lait 

A café au lait is the French way of preparing 'coffee with milk' both at home and in Cafés in Europe. "Café au lait" stems from the same continental tradition as "caffè latte" in Italy, "café con leche" in Spain, "kawa biała" ("white coffee") in Poland, "tejeskávé" in Hungary, "Milchkaffee" in Germany, "Melange" in Austria, "koffie verkeerd" in Netherlands, and "café com leite" in Portugal and Brazil, meaning simply "coffee with milk". In northern Europe, café au lait is the name most often used in coffee shops for what other places is a 'caffè latte'. The term 'café au lait' has been used for espresso and milk since the 1950s in among other places the United Kingdom, Netherlands, Belgium, Germany, Denmark, Norway and Sweden. In the United States, café au lait is defined as a coffee drink consisting strong or bold coffee (sometimes espresso) mixed with scalded milk in approximately a 1:1 ratio.

Ca phe sua 

Vietnamese cà phê sữa đá or "iced milk coffee", is made with a dark roast, often with chicory, brewed with a small metal Vietnamese drip filter into a cup containing sweetened condensed milk. The condensed milk and coffee are stirred together and then poured over ice. Ca phe sua nong (Vietnamese: 'cà phê sữa nóng') – literally, "hot milk coffee" – excludes the ice.

Café bombón  

Café bombón was made popular in Valencia, Spain, and spread gradually to the rest of the country. It might have been re-created and modified to suit European tastebuds as in many parts of Asia such as Malaysia, Thailand and Singapore the same recipe for coffee which is called "Kopi Susu Panas" (Malaysia) or "Gafeh Rorn" [lit: hot coffee] (Thailand) has already been around for decades and is very popular in "mamak" stalls and "kopitiams" in Malaysia. A café bombón, however, uses espresso served with sweetened condensed milk in a 1:1 ratio whereas the Asian version uses ground coffee and sweetened condensed milk at the same ratio. On the Canary Islands a variety named "Café Proprio" or "Largo Condensada" is served using the same amount of condensed milk but a "café largo" or espresso lungo. For café bombón, the condensed milk is added to the espresso. For visual effect, a glass is used, and the condensed milk is added slowly to sink underneath the coffee and create two separate bands of contrasting colour – though these layers are customarily stirred together before consumption. Some establishments merely serve an espresso with a sachet of condensed milk for patrons to make themselves.

Cafe Hafuch 
Cafe Hafuch or 'upside down coffee' is a popular drink in Israel. Steamed milk is first added to the cup, then espresso is carefully added to give a layered appearance. Milk foam is sometimes spooned on to the top to finish. 'Upside down' refers to this method of adding the ingredients, as in most milk-and-coffee drinks, the coffee is first in the cup, and the milk goes in second.

Cappuccino 

Cappuccino is a coffee-based drink prepared with espresso, hot milk, and steamed milk foam. A cappuccino usually exceeds the height of the cup, making the foam visible above the side of the cup. A cappuccino is traditionally served in a porcelain cup, which has far better heat retention characteristics than glass or paper. The foam on top of the cappuccino acts as an insulator and helps retain the heat of the liquid, allowing it to stay hotter longer.

Cortado 

A cortado (also known as "pingado" or "garoto") is an espresso "cut" (from the Spanish and Portuguese cortar) with warm milk to reduce the acidity. The ratio of milk to coffee is between 1:1 – 1:2, and the milk is added to the espresso. Though the steamed milk has little foam, many baristas make some micro foam to make latte art. It is popular in Spain and Portugal, in Norway as well as throughout Latin America, where it is drunk in the afternoon. In Cuba, it is known as a cortadito. It is usually served in a special glass, often with a metal ring base and a metal wire handle. There are several variations, including cortado condensada (espresso with condensed milk) and leche y leche (with condensed milk and cream on top). In the United States it is sometimes known as a "Gibraltar." It differs from cappuccino in having little or no milk foam, and from flat white in that the Cortado's 'Corto' shot of espresso is reduced in volume and caffeine content to the Flat White's 'Cortissimo'.

Café con leche 

Café con leche is one of the most common Spanish drinks that include coffee. It consists basically of two ingredients: coffee (as an infusion) and milk, with a proportion that varies according to local Spanish provinces, but is around the same amount. Generally, the term café con leche also implies the size of the cup used, which is usually large, between 200 and 250 ml (this cup is also called breakfast cup in some countries). The mixture of coffee and milk in a slightly smaller container is called a cortado (although in addition to the size the proportion of the constituents also changes).

Minato 
A minato is a double espresso shot with warm milk to reduce the acidity. The ratio of milk to coffee is between 1:1 – 1:2, and the milk is added to the espresso. Though the steamed milk has little foam, some baristas make some micro foam to make latte art. It is popular in Kent.

Egg coffee 
Egg coffee is a Vietnamese drink which is traditionally prepared with egg yolks, sugar, condensed milk and Robusta coffee in the Central Highlands of Vietnam, where 70% of global Robusta coffee is cultivated.

Eggnog latte 
An autumn and winter seasonal blend of steamed milk and eggnog, plus espresso and a pinch of nutmeg.

Eiskaffee 
Eiskaffee, literally "ice cream coffee," is a popular German drink consisting of chilled coffee, vanilla ice cream, and sometimes sugar or whipped cream.

Espressino 
An espressino is made from espresso, steamed milk, and cocoa powder, similar to the Marocchino.

Espresso con panna 
Espresso con panna is coffee with whipped cream.

Flat white 

Flat white is an espresso with a similar proportion of coffee to milk as a latte and a cappuccino, the main difference being the texture of the milk and (in some regions) the number of espresso shots.

The drink originated in a Sydney cafe in the early 1980s as an alternative to the frothier cappuccino. It became popular in New Zealand in the late 1980s and has since spread to the UK, where it was first served at independent cafes in London such as Department of Coffee and Social Affairs and Speak Easy where owners and staff from Australia and New Zealand brought the style of coffee into the UK before being adopted by chains Costa Coffee and Starbucks. Available in the form of a 12 oz. double latte from Starbucks in the US since January 6, 2015, it is rarely found in continental Europe.

In Australia and New Zealand it is traditionally made with two shots of espresso topped with stretched and textured milk. The milk is prepared by steaming air into the milk and folding the top layer into the lower layers. To achieve the "flat", non-frothy texture the steamed milk is poured from the bottom of the jug, holding back the lighter froth on the top in order to access milk with smaller bubbles, making the drink smooth and velvety in texture. This leads to a white coffee with the crema on top still intact. The drink was traditionally served in a ceramic cup used for cappuccinos (approximately 220–260 ml in capacity), though present-day speciality cafes are more likely to serve it in smaller (150–160 ml) cups with two Ristretto shots used, resulting in a drink noticeably stronger and less milky than a caffè latte.

Galão 

Galão is a hot drink from Portugal made of espresso and foamed milk. Similar to caffè latte or café au lait, it comes in a tall glass with plenty of milk. With only half milk, it is known as "meia de leite" In Madeira, a large, milky coffee is known as a "chinesa" (literally, "Chinese Lady").

Caffè gommosa 

A shot of espresso poured over a single marshmallow.  This originated in the coffeehouses of America's Pacific Northwest.  The resulting drink is sweet and thick, leading to the "caffè gommosa" name which means "rubbery coffee."

Indian Filter Coffee 
South Indian filter coffee is a coffee drink made by mixing frothed and boiled milk with the decoction obtained by brewing finely ground coffee powder in a traditional Indian filter. The drink known as Kaapi, is the Tamil phonetic rendering of "coffee".

Kopi susu 
Kopi susu is found in (at least) Brunei, Indonesia, and Malaysia and very similar to the preceding entry for Ca phe sua nong. Literally, kopi susu means "milk coffee". Served in a glass, kopi susu can be made simply by mixing black coffee (arabica) with about a quarter to half a glass of sweetened condensed milk then let stand to cool and allow the grounds to sink to the bottom. You should not drink this to the end unless you want to "eat" the ground coffee. Another version of kopi susu uses fresh milk. In Indonesia, the milk coffee added with ice and palm sugar and is called es kopi susu gula aren. Also, kopi tubruk is as above but uses sugar instead of sweetened condensed milk.

Latte 

A latte is an espresso and steamed milk, generally in a 1:3 to 1:5 ratio of espresso to milk, with a little foam on top.

In Italy it is called caffè latte or caffelatte, which means "coffee and milk". In northern Europe and Scandinavia the term 'café au lait' has traditionally been used for the combination of espresso and milk, but this term is used in the US for brewed coffee and scalded milk. In France, 'caffè latte' is mostly known from American coffee chains; a combination of espresso and steamed milk equivalent to a 'latte' is in French called 'grand crème' and in German 'Milchkaffee' or 'Melange'. In Portuguese it is called galão.

Variants include the chocolate-flavored mocha, or replacing the coffee with another drink base such as masala chai (spiced Indian tea), mate or matcha, and other types of milk, such as soy milk or almond milk are also used.

Latte macchiato 
Latte macchiato literally means stained milk. This refers to the method of preparation, wherein the milk gets "stained" by the addition of espresso. It differs from latte firstly in that espresso is added to milk (rather than milk to espresso), secondly that it features more foam, rather than simply hot milk, thirdly in that often only ½ (or less) of an espresso shot is used, and fourthly in that it is often a "layered" drink, rather than being mixed as in a caffè latte. Simply, in a latte, the emphasis is on the coffee, while in a latte macchiato, the emphasis is on the milk.

Macchiato 

Macchiato, meaning "stained", is an espresso with a dash of foamed milk. At first sight it resembles a small cappuccino, but even if the ingredients are the same as those used for cappuccino, a macchiato has a much stronger and aromatic taste. The milk is foamed directly into the espresso cup, which is then put under the coffee outlet. The espresso is then drawn into the cup. Cocoa is sometimes sprinkled over the drink. Often the process is reversed and milk foam is floated on top of extracted coffee. A long macchiato will have two shots of espresso and a small amount of hot water (as per long black). A short macchiato will usually have one shot of coffee and less water (as per short black).

Wiener or Viennese melange 

Melange is popular in Austria, Switzerland and the Netherlands, and is traditionally similar to latte and cappuccino. It consists of espresso, steamed milk, and milk foam served in a large cup. It is sometimes topped with whipped cream. Outside Vienna the drink is sometimes referred to as Wiener Melange. The Melange originated in the 1700s as a Café drink in Austria.

A Wiener Melange is a speciality coffee drink similar to a cappuccino. The difference is sometimes assumed to be that the melange is made with milder coffee but the Viennese coffee company Julius Meinl describes a Wiener melange as "One small espresso served in a large cup of coffee. Steam milk and add milk foam to coffee (=small milk coffee)". At Cafe Sperl in Vienna, the Melange is 1/2 cup "black coffee" and 1/2 cup creamy milk, completed by milk foam.

White coffee 
Ipoh white coffee is a popular coffee drink which originated in Ipoh, Perak, Malaysia. The coffee beans are roasted with palm-oil margarine, and the resulting coffee is served with condensed milk. The taste is smooth and sweet, and is often served iced.

White coffee (UK) 
'White coffee' is the British alternative to a 'black coffee;' it is any form of black coffee with fresh cold milk added. Sometimes, hot milk (boiled or not) is used instead of cold.

Vienna coffee 
A Vienna coffee (not to be confused with "Vienna roast" coffee), is coffee or espresso topped with whipped cream. Milk is sometimes poured into the coffee/espresso before adding the whipped cream. Vanilla, chocolate or cinnamon is sometimes sprinkled on the cream. Melange mit schlag (or schlagobers) is the Austrian term for coffee with whipped cream. Austria has a number of coffees with whipped cream.

Coffee Regular 
A "regular coffee" or "coffee regular" is a popular coffee drink in New England. In much of New England, a "regular coffee" refers to coffee with cream and sugar. The most common amount usually includes three creams and three sugars. A "coffee regular" can be had either hot or as iced coffee.

See also 

 List of coffee drinks

References

External links

Coffee drinks
Milk-based drinks